Bainet is an arrondissement in the Sud-Est department of Haiti. As of 2015, the population was 135,792 inhabitants. Postal codes in the Bainet Arrondissement start with the number 92.

The arondissement consists of the following communes:
 Bainet
 Côtes-de-Fer

References

Arrondissements of Haiti
Sud-Est (department)